Crimewatch (formerly Crimewatch UK) is  a British television programme produced by the BBC, that reconstructs major unsolved crimes in order to gain information from the public which may assist in solving the case. The programme was originally broadcast once a month on BBC One, although in the final years before cancellation it was usually broadcast roughly once every two months.

Crimewatch was first broadcast on 7 June 1984, and is based on the German TV show Aktenzeichen XY… ungelöst (which translates as File Reference XY … Unsolved). Nick Ross and Sue Cook presented the show for the first eleven years, until Cook's departure in June 1995. Cook was replaced by Jill Dando. After Dando was murdered in April 1999, Ross hosted Crimewatch alone until January 2000, when Fiona Bruce joined the show.

Kirsty Young and Matthew Amroliwala replaced Ross and Bruce following their departures in 2007. The BBC announced on 15 October 2008 that they would move  production of shows such as Crimewatch to studios in Cardiff. Young and Amroliwala remained as the lead presenters until 2015. Following a brief period with guest presenter Sophie Raworth in 2016, it was announced that the show would relaunch in September 2016 with a new weekly format. The new presenters were announced as Jeremy Vine and Tina Daheley. The new series began on 5 September 2016, with the final episode broadcast on 20 March 2017.

In October 2017, the BBC announced that the main Crimewatch series had been cancelled, citing declining viewership. The daytime spin-off series Crimewatch Roadshow (now Crimewatch Live) would continue to air, but will also air more episodes per year. Crime NI, a similar live monthly programme in partnership with Crimestoppers UK, was aired from 3 September 2021 to 11 April 2022 on BBC One Northern Ireland and presented by Wendy Austin and Dearbhail McDonald.

History
The idea for the show came from the UK programme Police 5 and the German Aktenzeichen XY… ungelöst (File Reference XY … Unsolved). Producers viewed the shows and rejected the overt reconstructions with music to build suspense in America's Most Wanted, and were also against the idea of filming the reconstruction from the perspective of the offender as in Aktenzeichen XY… ungelöst (particularly for sexual assaults). However, they favoured the idea of audience participation in the show.

Originally, Crimewatch UK (as it was then known) was due to run for only three programmes. It was regarded as an experiment when it was first shown due to doubts that the police would take part and scepticism as to whether witnesses and victims would welcome the idea. There was also concern that it could be considered to prejudice a jury. In over 25 years, 57 murderers, 53 rapists and sex offenders, 18 paedophiles, and others were captured as a direct result of Crimewatch appeals.

The original theme music was "Rescue Helicopter" (1980) by John Cameron (Bruton Music).

Show format

Main programme

Crimewatch used to be shown once a month on BBC One usually at 9pm, with a Crimewatch Update at 10.35 (following the BBC News at Ten). Since March 2011 the show aired less frequently, roughly once every two months. It featured approximately three or four cases per show, with each case featuring reconstructions of the crime. It was one of the largest live factual studio productions. The films shown often feature interviews with senior detectives and/or relatives or friends of victims. Key evidence is usually shown, such as E-FIT profiles of suspects and details of certain lines of enquiry.

Other features to the show included a "CCTV section", which showed crimes caught on CCTV with enhanced imagery of suspects. A "Wanted Faces" section was also featured: eight close-up pictures of suspects police are trying to trace are shown on screen. This section also frequently involves information about suspects, including aliases. These eight photos are shown upon the programme's closing credits, one of the few programmes in which the BBC do not 'show the credits in reduced size'.

Viewers could contact Crimewatch by phoning 0500 600 600, with the phone lines remaining open until midnight the night following the programme. Viewers could also send text messages to 63399. Due to the high demand for cases to be shown on the programme, many other cases are added to the Crimewatch website. These are joined by reconstructions, CCTV footage and wanted faces that have been shown on previous programmes. All reconstructions, CCTV footage, faces and cases remain on the Crimewatch website until the criminals are caught or suspects convicted. Crimewatch can be watched on the BBC iPlayer catch-up service for 24 hours from broadcast.

Crimewatch Update
Following the main programme, there was a 10–15 minute follow-up after the BBC News at Ten, with updates on calls and results from the earlier broadcast. This was removed when the show relaunched in September 2016.

Involvement
Several police officers have appeared on the programme from the studio, including David Hatcher, Helen Phelps, Jeremy Paine, Jacqui Hames, Jonathan Morrison, Jane Corrigan, and Rav Wilding. For many years the programme also included antiques experts John Bly, Eric Knowles and Paul Hayes to help with 'treasure trove' details of recovered goods believed to have been stolen.

Despite initial police concerns about involvement (only three forces out of more than 40 agreed to participate initially), Crimewatch developed a special status with police and was credited with an expertise of its own, notably through Nick Ross' long experience with public appeals. Unlike the American equivalent, America's Most Wanted, Crimewatch itself usually appeals for unsolved cases inviting viewers to be armchair detectives. According to the producers, about a third of its cases are solved, half of those as a direct result of viewers' calls. Its successes have included some of Britain's most notorious crimes, including the kidnap of Stephanie Slater and murder of Julie Dart, the M25 rapist, the road-rage killing by Kenneth Noye, and the capture of two boys for the abduction and murder of James Bulger.

Over the years, Crimewatch has featured appeals from all 43 police forces in the country. 1 in 3 appeals leads to an arrest and 1 in 5 lead to a conviction. 4 or 5 requests to air appeals are received from police forces every day.

Ratings and public response
At its peak, Crimewatch was seen by 14 million viewers per week. However, by 2017, credited to competition from other programmes, it had fallen to an average of 3 million.

A study by the Broadcasting Standards Council found that Crimewatch increased the fear of crime in over half of its respondents, and a third said it made them feel "afraid". However, according to John Sears, senior English lecturer at Manchester Metropolitan University, it provides a beneficial role, performing "a social function by helping to solve crime, and drawing on the collective responsibilities, experiences and knowledge of the viewing audience in order to do so."

Presenters

Lead presenters

Police officers

Stand-in presenters

Featured cases

Victims

Suspects and criminal offenders

Transmissions

Spin-offs

Crimewatch File

First aired on 10 August 1988, Crimewatch File is an hour-long programme devoted to the reconstruction and investigation of a single case including cases that the programme has previously helped to solve. Presented by Nick Ross and Sue Cook concurrently (with Jill Dando taking over from Cook in 1996), more than thirty editions aired until April 2000, when the final edition, fronted by Ross, was broadcast. Following this, in latter years of the main Crimewatch programme, episodes would regularly feature segments and reports in a very similar vein to Crimewatch File.

Crime Limited

Crime Limited was the second spin-off from Crimewatch which took cameras behind the scenes of the crimes. The first series aired on BBC One over ten episodes in 1992 and was presented by Nick Ross and Sue Cook. A second series ran in 1993 and a third series ran in 1994.

Crimewatch Extra
First aired in late 1998, Crimewatch Extra was a short-lived spin-off from the main programme, which would give updates and reports received on the cases featured in the previous month's programme. Broadcast on BBC Choice, the series was presented by Emma Howard. Around ten episodes were broadcast, with the final episode airing on 25 August 1999.

Crimewatch Extra transmissions

Crimewatch Solved

Beginning on 10 August 1999, a new yearly programme entitled Crimewatch: Solved was transmitted, showing cases previously featured on the programme that resulted in convictions. Aside from 2002, a new edition was broadcast every year until 2010, when the thirteenth and final edition aired on 1 September 2010.

Crimewatch Live

The BBC has aired a number of weekday Crimewatch programmes. Originally shown between 2000 and 2001, Crimewatch Daily was the first daily version of the programme, aired between 10:00 and 11:00am on weekday mornings, that appealed for help with unsolved cases not covered in the main programme. Originally shown between 2009 and 2020, Crimewatch Roadshow was the second daily version of the programme, that was broadcast on weekdays from 9:15 to 10:00am. From 8 March 2021, the show's name was changed to Crimewatch Live and is aired between 10.00 and 10:45am on weekday mornings.

Crimewatch Specials
Crimewatch also aired a number of one-off programmes.

First aired on 21 May 1997, Crimewatch: Hot Property was a one-off special presented by Jill Dando. The programme's aim was to help people find their stolen property that were recovered in police raids.

Crimewatch Specials transmissions

New Zealand version
A licensed New Zealand version of Crimewatch was broadcast on TVNZ from 1987 until 1996 and was replaced by NZI Crimescene which was aired in 1997 and 1998. Based on the original BBC format, it was shown once a month on TV One.

In its first year, Crimewatch was shown on fourth Mondays at 8pm before moving to fourth Tuesdays at 8pm in 1988 and 8.30pm from 1989 (with a Crimewatch Update aired at around 11pm) until mid-1996. The programme moved to TV2 on 1 August 1996 and aired at 8.30pm on a fourth Thursday until it ended later that year.

Ian Johnstone presented the New Zealand version throughout its entire run, and was joined by Natalie Brunt (1987–88), Carol Hirschfeld (1989–93), Tiana Tofilau (1994) and Mairanga White (1995–96) as successive co-presenters. Calls to the show's special phoneline helped police solve approximately 1,400 cases.

See also

 Police 5 (United Kingdom)
 Manhunt – Solving Britain's Crimes (United Kingdom)
 America's Most Wanted (United States)
 Fugitive Watch (United States)
 Unsolved Mysteries (United States)
 Crime Watch Daily (United States)
 The Hunt with John Walsh (United States)
 Aktenzeichen XY… ungelöst (Germany)
 Efterlyst (Sweden)
 Crimecall (Ireland)
 Ten 7 Aotearoa (New Zealand)
 India's Most Wanted (India)
 Police Report (Hong Kong)
 Linha Direta (Brazil)
 Crime Watch (Trinidad and Tobago)
 Crimewatch Singapore

References

External links

Crimewatch on Website

1980s British crime television series
1984 British television series debuts
1990s British crime television series
2000s British crime television series
2010s British crime television series
2017 British television series endings
BBC crime television shows
Law enforcement in the United Kingdom
British television series based on non-British television series
Crimewatch